Borrelia afzelii is a species of Borrelia a bacterium that can infect various species of vertebrates and invertebrates.

Among 30 Borrelia known species, it is one of four which are likely to infect humans causing a variant of Lyme disease.

Coinfection by this Borrelia species with one or more pathogens can occur, carried by the vector, which appears to be in most cases the tick.

It is named after Swedish dermatologist Arvid Afzelius.

See also
 Lyme disease

References

Further reading

External links
 Type strain of Borrelia afzelii at BacDive -  the Bacterial Diversity Metadatabase

Lyme disease
afzelii
Bacteria described in 1994